Winchester is a town in Cheshire County, New Hampshire, United States. The population was 4,150 at the 2020 census. The primary community in the town, where 1,606 people resided at the 2020 census, is defined by the U.S. Census Bureau as the Winchester census-designated place (CDP). The town also includes the village of Ashuelot and part of Pisgah State Park.

History

Originally named "Arlington" in honor of Charles Fitzroy, Earl of Arlington, this town was one of those established in 1733 by colonial Governor Jonathan Belcher as protection for the Massachusetts Bay Colony border at the Connecticut River. This was in the area encompassed in the relatively newly acquired Equivalent Lands. After being designated a part of the Province of New Hampshire in 1741, the town was granted to Colonel Josiah Willard, commander of the Fort Dummer outpost. In 1753, it was incorporated by Governor Benning Wentworth as "Winchester", for Charles Paulet, 3rd Duke of Bolton, 8th Marquess of Winchester, and constable of the Tower of London.

Pioneers who came to the town as early as 1732 were attacked many times by Indians. Several settlers were taken captive, and the town was burned in 1745. Its church, founded in 1736, is the oldest religious body in Cheshire County. The town has two covered bridges.

The Winchester Profession, an influential statement of the principles of Universalism, was adopted at a Universalist congress in Winchester in 1803.

Although it has been an agricultural town, many small industries have been established in Winchester. In the 1830s, Graves & Company was among the nation's first manufacturers of musical instruments. The coming of the Ashuelot Railroad in 1850 fostered the growth of textile mills and wooden-ware factories, especially box manufacture and leather tanning.

Geography
Winchester is drained by the Ashuelot River and its tributary Mirey Brook. Pisgah Reservoir and Kilburn Pond are in the northwest. The entire town is part of the Connecticut River watershed. The highest point in Winchester is  Franklin Mountain, near the town's northeast corner.

Winchester is served by state routes 10, 78 and 119.

Adjacent municipalities
 Chesterfield (north)
 Swanzey (northeast)
 Richmond (east)
 Warwick, Massachusetts (south)
 Northfield, Massachusetts (southwest)
 Hinsdale (west)

Demographics

As of the census of 2010, there were 4,341 people, 1,689 households, and 1,129 families residing in the town. There were 1,932 housing units, of which 243, or 12.6%, were vacant. 124 of the vacant units were for seasonal or recreational use. The racial makeup of the town was 96.1% white, 0.5% African American, 0.5% Native American, 0.6% Asian, 0.0% Native Hawaiian or Pacific Islander, 0.5% some other race, and 1.8% from two or more races. 1.8% of the population were Hispanic or Latino of any race.

Of the 1,689 households, 31.9% had children under the age of 18 living with them, 47.5% were headed by married couples living together, 12.3% had a female householder with no husband present, and 33.2% were non-families. 24.3% of all households were made up of individuals, and 9.6% were someone living alone who was 65 years of age or older. The average household size was 2.54, and the average family size was 2.97.

In the town, 22.9% of the population were under the age of 18, 8.4% were from 18 to 24, 24.3% from 25 to 44, 29.9% from 45 to 64, and 14.7% were 65 years of age or older. The median age was 41.1 years. For every 100 females, there were 98.0 males. For every 100 females age 18 and over, there were 93.9 males.

For the period 2011–2015, the estimated median annual income for a household was $44,760, and the median income for a family was $53,864. Male full-time workers had a median income of $37,213 versus $37,056 for females. The per capita income for the town was $23,404. 13.9% of the population and 12.8% of families were below the poverty line. 20.8% of the population under the age of 18 and 9.9% of those 65 or older were living in poverty.

Culture 
Since 1998, Winchester has held its annual Pickle Festival each September on its Main Street.

Sites of interest
 Ashuelot Covered Bridge
 Conant Library Museum
 Monadnock Speedway
 Sheridan House (1870), the Winchester Historical Society Museum

Notable people 

 Persis Foster Eames Albee (1836–1914), considered the first "Avon Lady" due to her successful marketing techniques and her recruiting and training of other sales personnel
 Jane Grace Alexander (1848-1932), banker
 Henry Ashley (1778–1829), US congressman
 Michael Dubruiel (1958–2009), Roman Catholic author
 Louis B. Goodall (1851–1935), industrialist, banker, US congressman
 Marshall Jewell (1825–1883), 25th US Postmaster General; 44th and 46th governor of Connecticut 
 Francis P. Murphy (1877–1958), 64th governor of New Hampshire 
 Addison Pratt (1802–1872), early Latter-day Saints convert and missionary; recognized by the Church of Jesus Christ of Latter-day Saints as the first Latter-day Saint missionary to preach in a language other than English
 Leonard Wood (1860–1927), US Army chief of staff

References

External links
 
 Conant Public Library
 New Hampshire Economic and Labor Market Information Bureau Profile
 Pisgah State Park

 
Towns in Cheshire County, New Hampshire
Towns in New Hampshire